The Six Days of Boston was a six-day cycling event, held in Boston, Massachusetts, USA, between 1901 and 1933. It took place thirteen times during that period. Alfred Goullet, Alfred Hill and Norman Hill share the record with two wins each.

Roll of honor

References

1901 establishments in Massachusetts
1933 disestablishments in Massachusetts
Cycling in Massachusetts
Defunct cycling races in the United States
International cycle races hosted by the United States
Recurring sporting events disestablished in 1933
Recurring sporting events established in 1901
Six-day races
Sports competitions in Boston